Tieton Dam is an earth and concrete type dam on the Tieton River in Yakima County, in the U.S. state of Washington. The dam began operation in 1925. This dam is a component of the Yakima Project. Tieton Dam also produces electricity for Burbank Water and Power and Glendale Water and Power, near Los Angeles. The Southern California Public Power Agency installed two 7 megawatt generators in a project started in 2010. The power is transmitted over the DC Intertie that runs from Celilo, Oregon to Sylmar, California. Upstream from the dam, the river is impounded by Clear Creek Dam, another element of the Yakima Project.

References

External links

Historic American Engineering Record (HAER) documentation, filed under Naches, Yakima County, WA:

Dams in Washington (state)
Buildings and structures in Yakima County, Washington
United States Bureau of Reclamation dams
Dams completed in 1925
Earth-filled dams
Historic American Engineering Record in Washington (state)